Anthony Michael Ferrari (born June 22, 1978) is a former Major League Baseball player. A pitcher, Ferrari appeared in four games for the Montreal Expos in 2003.

Ferrari attended Redwood High School (Larkspur, California) and Lewis-Clark State College. He was drafted by the Expos in the 44th round of the 2000 Major League Baseball draft. After three years in the minors, he made his major league debut on June 7, . He spent just twelve days in the majors before being sent back down on June 18.

After his brief term in the majors, Ferrari played in the minors for several more years.

References

External links

1978 births
Living people
American people of Italian descent
American expatriate baseball players in Canada
Baseball players from San Francisco
Camden Riversharks players
Edmonton Trappers players
Grosseto Baseball Club players
American expatriate baseball players in Italy
Harrisburg Senators players
Jupiter Hammerheads players
Lewis–Clark State Warriors baseball players
Major League Baseball pitchers
Montreal Expos players
Potomac Nationals players
Springfield Cardinals players
Vermont Expos players
Redwood High School (Larkspur, California) alumni